Dylan Raphaël Colette Fage (born 18 March 1999) is a French professional footballer who plays for English club Macclesfield of the Northern Premier League Division One West, as a midfielder.

Career
Fage was born in Paris.

After playing for Auxerre II, he signed for English club Oldham Athletic in July 2019, with the contract being extended in April 2021. Fage was released following relegation at the end of the 2021–22 season.

On 2 February 2023, Fage signed for Northern Premier League Division One West side Macclesfield.

Career statistics

References

1999 births
Living people
French footballers
Footballers from Paris
Association football midfielders
AJ Auxerre players
Oldham Athletic A.F.C. players
English Football League players
French expatriate footballers
Expatriate footballers in England
French expatriate sportspeople in England
Macclesfield F.C. players